Piano Man is the debut album led by pianist Hilton Ruiz recorded in 1975 and released on the Danish label, SteepleChase.

Reception

The AllMusic review by Michael G. Nastos called it "First-rate".

Track listing 
 "One for Hakim" (Hilton Ruiz) – 4:15
 "Misty Thursday" (Duke Jordan) – 11:12
 "Medi II" (Mary Lou Williams) – 4:30
 "Straight Street" (John Coltrane) – 3:57
 "Big Foot" (Charlie Parker) – 10:40
 "Arrival" (Ruiz) – 8:10
 "Giant Steps" (Coltrane) – 10:29 Additional track on CD

Personnel 
Hilton Ruiz – piano
Buster Williams – bass
Billy Higgins – drums

References 

Hilton Ruiz albums
1975 albums
SteepleChase Records albums